Karl Ting Tze Long (born 30 June 1997) is a Hong Kong actor and television presenter.  Ting joined TVB after winning first-runner up, Mr. Photogenic, and Most Liked by Audience awards at the Mr. Hong Kong 2016 contest. He was the first Mr. Photogenic, and the youngest contestant to win the most awards in the contest's history.

Early life

Karl Ting was born in British Hong Kong on June 30 1997, the last day of British rule in Hong Kong.  He studied at Pui Kiu College before immigrating to Toronto, Canada at the age of 14.  After graduating from Markville Secondary School, he completed his freshman year at the University of Waterloo.  Ting speaks four languages - Cantonese, English, Mandarin, and Korean.  He learned Choy Li Fut from grade 1 to grade 9  and hence performed it as his talent at both competitions.  He enjoys filming short clips and uploading them to YouTube.  His personal channel is named, "Karl Ting 丁子朗."

Project Boyz Power Toronto

Under the encouragement of his relatives, Ting entered the inaugural Project Boyz Power Toronto (PBPT), a preliminary organized by Fairchild TV that sends overseas contestants to the Mr. Hong Kong contest.  TVB executives Virginia Lok and Sandy Yu attended the event to seek eligible candidates for TVB.  Ting did not win any awards at the contest, with Freeyon Chung being the winner and Christian Yeung winning first runner-up.

Mr. Hong Kong 2016

After PBPT, all eligible candidates received a casting opportunity for Mr. Hong Kong.  As the winner, Chung received a complimentary air ticket, while Yeung and Ting traveled to Hong Kong at their own expense.  All three entered the Mr. Hong Kong 2016 contest (which was on a five-year hiatus previously) and successfully made the top 14 after two rounds of interview.  Consequently, they all made the top 10 and gained the opportunity to travel to Taiwan for filming and shooting.

For the first time, the Mr. Hong Kong and Miss Hong Kong pageants were held together; with the winners being announced onstage.  Initially criticized for his body, Ting bested a number of favorites and ended up winning the most awards in the contest - First-Runner Up, Mr. Photogenic, and a side award - Most Liked by Audience.

Venture into TVB

After the contest, he joined TVB and became the first Mr. Hong Kong to host a TVB Anniversary.  Subsequently, Ting and most of the 2016 Miss and Mr. Hong Kong contestants enrolled in a three month long acting course.  Dubbed as the 29th annual TVB Acting course and the first annual TVB Advance Acting Course, he graduated in March 2017.  Since then, he has received numerous hosting opportunities, most of them being variety shows.  In July 2017, he was cast for a role in the new drama, 再創世紀, a sequel of At the Threshold of an Era.  He was selected alongside Chris Lai, Mat Yeung, and Matthew Ho as the promo ambassadors for the Miss Hong Kong 2017 Pageant.  Ting plans to finish his college education in the future.

Filmography

Television dramas

Television presenter

Variety shows

Micro movie

Awards

References

External links
Project Boyz Power Toronto Profile 
Mr. Hong Kong 2016 Profile 
YouTube Channel - 膠Ding日記 Your Happy Virus
Karl Ting at Instagram
Karl Ting 丁子朗 Official Facebook

Hong Kong beauty pageant winners
1997 births
Living people